Hartenstein is a town in the Zwickau district, in Saxony, Germany. It is situated on the river Zwickauer Mulde, 14 km southeast of Zwickau.

The county of Hartenstein was owned by the House of Schönburg from 1406 until 1945.

Sons and daughters of the city 

 Johann Heinrich von Lindenau (born 1586 at the castle Hartenstein, † 1615 in Börnichen b. Oederan), owner of a manor
 Paul Fleming (poet) (1609-1640), physician and writer of the Baroque
 Magnus Meischner (1821-1892), jurist and politician, MdL (Kingdom of Saxony)

References 

Towns in the Ore Mountains
Zwickau (district)